The Marvels Project is a 2009–2010 eight-issue comic book limited series written by Ed Brubaker with art by Steve Epting and published by Marvel Comics.

Premise
The Marvels Project details the origins of Timely Comics-era superheroes in the Marvel Universe such as Captain America, Namor, the Human Torch and the Angel.

References

 

Comics by Ed Brubaker